The 2011–12 Florida State Seminoles men's basketball team represented Florida State University in the 2011–12 NCAA Division I men's basketball season. The Seminoles, led by 10th year head coach Leonard Hamilton, played their home games at the Donald L. Tucker Center and were members of the Atlantic Coast Conference.

In addition to defeating traditional ACC powers North Carolina and Duke in both the regular season and the ACC Tournament, the Seminoles won their first ACC championship in program history.

The Seminoles received an automatic bid to the 2012 NCAA Division I men's basketball tournament where they defeated St. Bonaventure in the first round before falling to Cincinnati in the second round.

Previous season
The Seminoles finished the 2010–11 season 23–11, 11–5 in ACC play and lost in the Sweet Sixteen round of the NCAA tournament to VCU.

Roster

Schedule

|-
!colspan=9 style="background:#; color:white;"| Exhibition

|-
!colspan=9 style="background:#; color:white;"| Non-conference regular season

|-
!colspan=9 style="background:#; color:white;"| ACC regular season

|-
!colspan=9 style="background:#; color:white;"| ACC Tournament

|-
!colspan=9 style="background:#; color:white;"|  NCAA Tournament

NBA draft

References

External links
Official Team Website
Almanac
Statistics

Florida State
Florida State Seminoles men's basketball seasons
Florida State
Florida State Seminoles men's basketball
Florida State Seminoles men's basketball